In plane geometry, a Jacobi point is a point in the Euclidean plane determined by a triangle ABC and a triple of angles α, β, and γ. This information is sufficient to determine three points X, Y, and Z such that ∠ZAB = ∠YAC =  α,  ∠XBC = ∠ZBA = β, and ∠YCA = ∠XCB = γ.

The Jacobi point is a generalization of the Fermat point, which is obtained by letting α = β = γ = 60° and triangle  ABC having no angle being greater or equal to 120°. 

If the three angles above are equal, then N lies on the rectangular hyperbola given in areal coordinates by

which is Kiepert's hyperbola. Each choice of three equal angles determines a triangle center.

References

Theorems about triangles